Epicrocis signatella is a species of snout moth in the genus Epicrocis. It was described by Pagenstecher in 1907. It is found in Madagascar.

The adults of this species have a wingspan of 32mm.

References

Phycitini
Lepidoptera of Madagascar
Moths of Madagascar
Moths of Africa
Moths described in 1907